Frederick "Fred" E. Carl (September 8, 1858 – January 13, 1899) was an American professional baseball player who played in 25 games for the Louisville Colonels during the  season.
He was born in Baltimore, Maryland and died there at the age of 40.

External links

Baseball players from Baltimore
Louisville Colonels players
1858 births
1899 deaths
York (minor league baseball) players
York White Roses players
Norfolk (minor league baseball) players
Haverhill (minor league baseball) players
Charleston Quakers players
Charleston Seagulls players
Newark Little Giants players
Wilmington Blue Hens players
Elmira Gladiators players
Lowell Lowells players
19th-century baseball players